Scarborough Health Network (SHN) is a hospital network in Scarborough, Toronto, Ontario, Canada. It operates the Scarborough General, Centenary, and Birchmount hospitals. The three are major community health hospitals with teaching affiliations to the University of Toronto Faculty of Medicine.

History
In 1998, The Salvation Army merged the operations of Scarborough General and Birchmount hospitals under its subsidiary The Scarborough Hospital, while Centenary Hospital was under the Rouge Valley Health System with latter hospital network dissolved, transferring Centenary Hospital's administration to The Scarborough Hospital. The new network of the three hospitals was tentatively named Scarborough and Rouge Hospital in 2016. In 2018, it was officially renamed as the Scarborough Health Network.

On January 24, 2019, the Scarborough Health Network approved the closure of pediatrics and obstetrics services at the Birchmount Hospital.  As of 2019, the hospital network plans to reduce the number of hospital sites from three to two by 2031. In the three expansion options, the Centenary Hospital is planned for renovation while both the General and Birchmount hospitals are alternatively considered for shut down as a new hospital will be built at a different site in Scarborough. A local campaign known as Save the Grace, headed by Toronto city councillor Jim Karygiannis, appeals to the Government of Ontario to save the Birchmount Hospital.

Hospitals
SHN General Hospital, opened 1956
SHN Centenary Hospital, opened 1967
SHN Birchmount Hospital, opened 1985

See also

List of hospitals in Toronto

References

External links
 

Hospitals in Toronto
Buildings and structures in Scarborough, Toronto
Hospitals established in 1999
Hospital networks in Canada
1999 establishments in Ontario